Mohamed Hamed Al-Bishi (born 29 October 1975) is a Saudi Arabian sprinter. He competed in the men's 400 metres at the 1996 Summer Olympics.

References

1975 births
Living people
Athletes (track and field) at the 1996 Summer Olympics
Athletes (track and field) at the 2000 Summer Olympics
Saudi Arabian male sprinters
Olympic athletes of Saudi Arabia
Place of birth missing (living people)
Athletes (track and field) at the 1994 Asian Games
Asian Games competitors for Saudi Arabia